Pohnpei State (IPA: /pɔ:n peɪ/) is one of the four states of the Federated States of Micronesia (FSM). The other states are, from east to west, Kosrae State, Chuuk State, and Yap State. The state's main island is Pohnpei.

History
The pre-colonial history of Pohnpei is divided into three stages: Mwehin Kawa or Mwehin Aramas (ca. 1100); Mwehin Sau Deleur (from ca. 1100 to ca. 1628); and Mwehin Nahnmwarki (from ca. 1628 to ca. 1885).

In Pohnpei there are interesting ruins of a Micronesian civilization, especially the ruins of Nan Madol.

Spanish Colonization 
The Caroline Islands, within which the island of Pohnpei is currently included, were visited on 22 August 1526 by the Spanish explorer Toribio Alonso de Salazar. On 1 January 1528, the explorer Alonso de Saavedra took possession of the islands of Uluti in the name of the King of Spain. The archipelago was visited in 1542, by the Matelotes Islands in 1543 and 1545, and by Legazpi in 1565.

The first European visitor to Ponapé was Pedro Fernández de Quirós, commanding the Spanish ship San Gerónimo. He sighted the island on 23 December 1595; his description of it is brief and he never landed there. The second known European visit did not occur until much later, by the Australian John Henry Rowe, his ship John Bull arrived on the island on September 10, 1825, being attacked by the natives. Pohnpei, together with the Senyavin Islands, was definitely included in the European navigation charts after being sighted by the Russian navigator Fyodor Litke in 1828, more than two centuries after the rest of the Caroline Islands. The main seat of government of the Carolinas was found on this island. The Spaniards called the island Ponapé and established the city of Santiago de la Ascensión, which became their first capital. As it was the seat of the Spanish colony (composed of officials, military, missionaries and Filipino workers) it became known simply as Colonia or Kolonia, adjacent to the current capital, Palikir.

In 1885, at the behest of the Spanish government, a new expedition was organized in the Philippines, then a colony of Spain, to proceed with the definitive occupation of the archipelago of the Carolinas, under Spanish sovereignty. The island of Ponapé, in the eastern part of the archipelago, extended over 2,000,000 square kilometers of ocean, was chosen as the seat of the government by means of the triple support of Manila-Guaján-Ponapé, which also made it possible to effectively patrol that vast expanse of jurisdictional waters.

Commander Posadillo was appointed head of the expedition and arrived on the island at the end of 1885. The scarce garrison and administrative equipment was installed on the island. The company was not economically profitable due to "the small variety of export products, the distance from the markets, the fact that it could only occupy a small number of square kilometers and the cost of maintaining a growing number of detachments"; it was rather due to prestige requirements. For this reason, when in 1887 there was an uprising by the indigenous people, who murdered the entire Spanish colony, a new expedition was immediately ordered to leave.

The troops that composed the next Spanish expedition were commanded by Commander Diaz Varela. Another chief of the Navy, Don Luis Cadarso y Rey, joined the expedition as governor of the archipelago. He would die eleven years later in Cavite, boarding the American battleship Olímpia, the flagship of the American fleet. Ponapé was reached after twelve days of painful journey and what the natives had destroyed was rebuilt, locking it in a fort. When they saw an important military presence on the island, they accepted the Spanish authority, advised by a European named Deoane, who lived among them, and who may have been the instigator of the previous rebellion.

While the Spanish domination lasted on the island, peaceful periods and skirmishes took place over that territory with a complicated morphology that made operations difficult. The rebellions were often joined by indigenous people from the adjacent islands over which no effective control could be exercised. Throughout those years, Spanish casualties as a result of these confrontations were proportionally numerous: in one of them, for example, there were thirty dead and fifty wounded. It was often necessary to apply authority with absolute force. The remains of Fort Alfonso XIII, known as "Spanish Wall", date from the colonial period.

German and Japanese control 
After the Spanish–American War of 1898, Germany bought the island from Spain; under German sovereignty, the colony was officially named Kolonia. Ponapé was occupied by Japan during the First World War, after which the League of Nations declared that the Carolinas Islands should pass to the Japanese administration, as a war debt for the German defeat, together with the Marshall Islands and the Mariana Islands (except Guam, US territory). Japanese sovereignty lasted from 1914 to 1945.

United States administration 
Pohnpei, when it was a district of the Trust Territory of the Pacific Islands, initially contained the island of Kosrae, which was a municipality of the district but in 1977 became a separate district. During World War II the islands were bypassed in the American amphibious campaigns between 1943 and 1945. Military installations were attacked on several occasions, including the USS Massachusetts (BB-59) and USS Iowa (BB-61) battle ship bombardments, as well as a USS Cowpens carrier air strike (CVL-25). At the end of the war, the Carolinas became part of the Pacific Islands Trust Territory.

The Federated States of Micronesia gained full independence in 1985. Since then, Pohnpei has been a sheltered tropical port under indirect U.S. control.

Geography
The state of Pohnpei is located in the Pacific Ocean near the eastern end of the Caroline Islands. It is approximately midway between Honolulu and Manila.

Pohnpei's outer islands are low islands, and include Pingelap, Mokil, Ant, Pakin, Ngatik, Nukuoro, Oroluk, and Kapingamarangi; also included is the largely submerged Minto Reef.

Its rainforest is dense and rich; extensive mangrove swamps line much of the low shore. The island is roughly circular in outline, its  coast surrounded by coral reef.

Municipalities
These are listed with their populations at the 2010 Census:
 Pohnpei Proper (34,789)
 Madolenihmw (5,767)
 Nett (6,639)
 Sokehs (6,647)
 Kitti (6,470)
 Kolonia (6,074)
 U (3,192)
 Outer islands (1,407)
 Mwoakilloa (or Mokil) (183)
 Pingelap (258)
 Sapwuahfik (formerly Ngatik) (456)
 Nukuoro (210)
 Kapingamarangi (350)
 Oroluk (no population) since 1985 part of Sokehs Municipality)

Politics and government
The State of Pohnpei is one of the four federal states of the Federated States of Micronesia. As a democratic federation, each state has the ability to retain large number of power within the state as well as a certain level of sovereignty typical of federal states. The chief executive of Pohnpei is the governor. Pohnpei has a unicameral legislature.

Education
Pohnpei State Department of Education operates public schools.

Public high schools:
 Kitti High School
 Madolenihmw High School
 Bailey Olter High School (former Pohnpei Island Central School) in Kolonia

Private schools:
 Calvary Christian Academy in Kolonia
 Ohwa Christian High School in Madolenihmw
Our Lady of Mercy Catholic High School in Kolonia
 Seventh Day Adventist High School in Kolonia

References

 
States of the Federated States of Micronesia